President Fernández may refer to:
Alberto Fernández (born 1959), President of Argentina
Cristina Fernández de Kirchner (born 1953), President of Argentina
Leonel Fernández (born 1953), President of the Dominican Republic
Próspero Fernández Oreamuno (1834–1885), President of Costa Rica

See also
Fernández